A total solar eclipse will take place on Monday, January 6, 2076. A solar eclipse occurs when the Moon passes between Earth and the Sun, thereby totally or partly obscuring the image of the Sun for a viewer on Earth. A total solar eclipse occurs when the Moon's apparent diameter is larger than the Sun's, blocking all direct sunlight, turning day into darkness. Totality occurs in a narrow path across Earth's surface, with the partial solar eclipse visible over a surrounding region thousands of kilometres wide.

Related eclipses

Solar eclipses 2073–2076

Saros 152

Metonic series

Notes

References

2076 01 06
2076 in science
2076 01 06
2076 01 06